Watson Ranch may be:

 Watson Ranch Quartzite, found near Ibex, Utah
 Watson Ranch (Nebraska), near Kearny
 Watson Ranch (California), near American Canyon